The 1998 South Tyneside Metropolitan Borough Council election took place on 7 May 1998 to elect members of South Tyneside Metropolitan Borough Council in Tyne and Wear, England. One third of the council was up for election and the Labour Party kept overall control of the council.

After the election, the composition of the council was:
Labour 51
Liberal Democrat 6
Others 3

Election result

References

1998 English local elections
1998
20th century in Tyne and Wear